This is a list of movies (including television movies) based on the Bible (Old Testament and New Testament), depicting characters or figures from the Bible, or broadly derived from the revelations or interpretations therein.

Old Testament / Hebrew Bible

Genesis

Genesis in General

Adam and Eve - Genesis 2-5

The Flood - Genesis 6-9

Abraham - Genesis 11:26-25:10
 Greatest Heroes of the Bible: Abraham's Sacrifice (1979, TV episode) 
 Animated Stories from the Bible: Abraham and Isaac (1992, TBN, TV episode) 
 Abraham (1993, TNT Bible Series)
 Abraham: The Friend of God (2008) (Iran)
 Abe and the Amazing Promise (2009)
 Young Abraham (2011)

Sodom and Gomorrah - Genesis 19
 Lot in Sodom (1933)
 Sodom and Gomorrah (1962)
 Greatest Heroes of the Bible: Sodom and Gomorrah (1979, TV episode) 
 Zohi Sdom (2010) (Israel)

Isaac - Genesis 24
 Isaac and Rebecca (1953) (Israel)

Jacob - Genesis 25:26-49:33
 The Story of Jacob and Joseph (1974)
 Greatest Heroes of the Bible: Jacob's Challenge (1979, TV episode) 
 Jacob (1994, TNT Bible Series)
 La Genese (1999) (France)

Dinah - Genesis 34
 The Red Tent (2014)

Joseph - Genesis 37-50

Moses (Exodus - Deuteronomy)

Judges Era

General Judges

Samson and Delilah - Judges 13-16

Ruth
 The Story of Ruth (1960) 
 Duke and the Great Pie War (2005)
 The Book of Ruth: Journey of Faith (2009)

Kings and Queens of Israel

David - First Samuel 16:1-First Kings 2:11

Solomon - First Kings 1-11

Jezebel - First Kings 16:29-Second Kings 9:37
Sins of Jezebel (1953)

Prophets

Exile

Daniel

Esther

Deuterocanonical / Apocrypha 
 Judith of Bethulia (1914)
 The Old Testament (1962) (Book of Maccabees film)

New Testament / Christian Bible

Life of Christ

Arabic 
 The Savior (2014) (Palestinian-Bulgarian-Jordanian production)

Aramaic/Latin 
 The Passion of the Christ (2004) (USA) (Aramaic and Latin audio)

English

Filipino 
 Kristo (1996) (Philippines)

French 
 Vie et Passion du Christ (1903) (France)
 Golgotha (1935) (France)

German 
 I.N.R.I (1923)  (Germany)
 Jesus – der Film (1986)  (Germany)

Italian

Malayalam 
 Jesus (1973) (India)

Persian
 The Messiah (2007) (Iran)

Sinhala 
 Christhu Charithaya (1990) (Sri Lanka)
 Jayathu Kristhu (TV 1999) (Sri Lanka)
 Jesu Kristhu Yuga Peraliya (TV 2013) (Sri Lanka)

Spanish

Telugu 
 Karunamayudu (1978) (India)
 Rajadhi Raju (1980) (India)
 Shanti Sandesham (2004) (India)
 Mulla Kireetam (2005) (India)

Animated movies

Mary, Mother of Jesus

Herod the Great
 Erode il Grande (1959) (Italy)

Mary Magdalene
 Magdalanaattu Mary (1957) (India)
 The Friends of Jesus - Mary Magdalene (2000)
 Mary Magdalene (2018)

John the Baptist
 Snapaka Yohannan (1963) (India)

Salome

Judas Iscariot

Barabbas

Parable of the Prodigal Son
 L'Enfant prodigue (1907) (France)
 L'Enfant prodigue (1916) (France)
 The Prodigal (1955)

Life of the Apostles

Creative

Revelation / Apocalypse

Fictional Interpolations

Adam and Eve
Mary's Incredible Dream (1976)
 Year One (film) (2009)
 The Tragedy of Man (2011) (Hungary)

Moses
 Wholly Moses! (1980)
 The Ten (2007)
 Seder-Masochism (2018)

Samson

Esther
 Megillas Lester (2014)

Ben-Hur

Early Christians

Opus Dei
The Da Vinci Code (2006)

See also

 The Bible in film
 Dramatic portrayals of Jesus Christ
 List of actors who have played Jesus
 Lists of movie source material
 List of Christian films
 List of Islamic films

References

Print sources 

Bible

Bible-related lists
Lists of historical films